Chutuka is a Kannada monthly children's  magazine, circulated in Karnataka, India.

The magazine is subscribed in women's educational institutions such as JSS college for women, and BMS college for women.

Background 
Chutuka (RNI:KARKAN/2000/03139), was started in 1991, by N. Sundar Rajan of Sangama Publications and is published by Apoorva Printers, Bengaluru, Karnataka.

See also

 Balamangala, a defunct Kannada fortnightly children magazine
 Champaka, a Kannada monthly children magazine
 Tunturu, a Kannada fortnightly children magazine
 List of Kannada-language magazines
 Media in Karnataka
 Media of India

References

Monthly magazines published in India
Children's magazines published in India
Kannada-language magazines
Magazines about comics
Magazines established in 1991
Mass media in Bangalore